Otokar Fischer (20 May 1883 – 12 March 1938) was a Czech translator, playwright, poet and critic.

He was born in Kolín, then part of the Austro-Hungarian Empire.

He made new translations of Goethe, Shakespeare and Villon. He was a professor at Prague university and the director of Bohemian National Theatre in Prague.

Died of a heart attack in theatre in Prague, as he learned that Hitler's army had occupied Austria.

External links 
 René Wellek: Otokar Fischer, in: The Slavonic and East European Review, Vol. 17, No. 49 (Jul., 1938), pp. 215–218 
 French translations of Fischer's poems
 Correspondence between Otokar Fischer, Rudolf Pannwitz and Pavel Eisner

1883 births
1938 deaths
Writers from Kolín
Czechoslovak writers
Czech male poets
Czech male dramatists and playwrights
20th-century Czech poets
20th-century Czech dramatists and playwrights
20th-century male writers
Translators of Johann Wolfgang von Goethe
Translators of William Shakespeare